Dhū al-Shamālayn ʿUmayr ibn ʿAbd ʿAmr al-Khuzāʿī (Arabic: ذو الشمالين عمير بن عبد عمرو الخزاعی) was a Meccan companion of the Islamic prophet, Muhammad, among the first Muslims known as al-Sabiqun al-Awwalun. He was a Badri martyr who sacrificed his life in the Battle of Badr al-Kubra also known as Ghazwat al-Badr or The Battle of Badr.

Early life
His father Abd Amr left his tribe to settle in Mecca. In Mecca he developed good relations with the tribe of Abd ibn al-Harith ibn Zuhra as a result of which Abd ibn al-Harith gave his daughter Ni'ma in marriage to Abd Amr. As a result of this union Umayr Dhu al-Shamalayn was born in 594 AD.

He was named Umayr, Kunya Abu Muhammad, title Dhu al-Shamalayn. His lineage was Umayr the son of Abd Amr the son Nadla the son of Amr the son of Ghabshan the son of Salim the son of Malik the son of Isa the son of Haritha Amr the son of Amir Al Khuza'i

Conversion and Hijra
Little is known about his conversion to Islam, but he accepted Islam before the Hijra. After his conversion he migrated to Medina (known as Hijra) and became a guest of Sa'd ibn Khaythama. Muhammad made him a Mawakhat brother of Yazid ibn al-Harith. Ibn al-Harith gave his daughter in marriage to Umayr from whom he had a son and a daughter named Umayr and Rayta respectively, hence title Dhu al-Shamalayn.

Hadith 
Sunan Nasai, Book of Sahu, Hadith no. 1229 and 1231.

Quranic Ayat 
Muhammad gave his sermons irrespective of cast, creed or wealth. The chieftains and rich among the Meccans, namely both sons of Rabi'a i.e. Utba and Shayba, Muti'm the son Adi, Harith son of Nawfal, Qarta son of Amr and the Chieftains of Abd Manaf all gathered and went to Abu Talib requesting Dhu al-Shamalayn to ask Muhammad to distance himself from common poor folk and the miserable, as only then would they visit his gatherings. They told Abu Talib that if Muhammad were to do so they would have great respect for him, visit his sermons and maybe understand his teachings. Abu Talib took their message to Muhammad. Umar ibn al-Khattab commented that nothing was wrong with their demand and that Muhammad should accept this. This incident inspired Ayat 6:53. The poorest companions that the racist and rich chieftains wanted to discard in addition to Amr Dhu al-Shamalayn were Bilal, Ammar, Salim Sabih, Mas'ud and Ibn Mas'ud, Miqdad, Waqid and Yazid.

Martyrdom

After Dhu al-Shamalayn came to Madina he participated in the Battle of Badr. This was his first and last Ghazwa. In this battle he sacrificed his life for Islam and became a Badri martyr, a holiness shared by only fourteen others. It is said that his Yazid ibn al-Harith didn't leave him even in death and both were martyred together in the battle. Dhu al-Shamalayn was only 30 at the time of his martyrdom. He was martyred at the hands of Abu Usama Jushmi and his pact brother Yazid ibn al-Harith.

References

594 births
624 deaths